Yílmar Alexis Filigrana Possu (born 8 November 1990), is a Colombian professional footballer who plays as a forward for Club Deportivo FAS

Career
Filigrana started his career with Alianza Petrolera. His professional debut came playing for Deportes Quindío where he played from 2013 to 2016. In 2017, he joined Brazilian side Coritiba. His first professional goal was against São Paulo in the Campeonato Brasileiro.

References

External links

1990 births
Living people
Colombian footballers
Colombian expatriate footballers
Association football forwards
Categoría Primera A players
Categoría Primera B players
Campeonato Brasileiro Série A players
Alianza Petrolera players
Deportes Quindío footballers
Coritiba Foot Ball Club players
Atlético Bucaramanga footballers
Colombian expatriate sportspeople in Brazil
Expatriate footballers in Brazil